Baritius eleutheroides is a moth of the family Erebidae first described by Walter Rothschild in 1909. It is found in Brazil, Peru, Suriname, French Guiana, Venezuela, Ecuador and Costa Rica.

References

Phaegopterina
Moths described in 1909